Amri Syahnawi (born 8 November 1998) is an Indonesian badminton player who specializes in doubles.

Career

2023 
In January, Amri Syahnawi and his partner Winny Oktavina Kandow competed at the Thailand Masters, but had to lose in the quarter-finals from 5th seed Korean pair Seo Seung-jae and Chae Yoo-jung.

Achievements

ASEAN University Games 
Men's doubles

Mixed doubles

BWF International Challenge/Series (7 titles, 2 runners-up) 
Men's doubles

Mixed doubles

  BWF International Challenge tournament
  BWF International Series tournament
  BWF Future Series tournament

Performance timeline

National team 
 Junior level

Individual competitions

Junior level 
 Mixed doubles

Senior level

Men's doubles

Mixed doubles

References

External links 
 

1998 births
Living people
People from Jakarta
Sportspeople from Jakarta
Indonesian male badminton players
21st-century Indonesian people